Zhang Ji may refer to:
 Zhang Ji (Han dynasty) (張濟) (died 196), official under the warlord Dong Zhuo
 Zhang Zhongjing (150–219), formal name Zhang Ji (張機), Han dynasty physician
 Zhang Ji (Derong) (張既) (died 223), general of Cao Wei of the Three Kingdoms period
 Zhang Ji (Jingzhong) (張緝) (died 254), Zhang Ji (Derong)'s son, politician of Cao Wei
 Zhang Ji (poet from Hubei) (張繼) (fl. 715–779), Tang dynasty poet from Hubei
 Zhang Ji (poet from Jiangnan) (張籍) (c. 766–830), Tang dynasty poet from Jiangnan
 Zhang Ji (Southern Tang) (張洎) (934–997), official under the Southern Tang and Song dynasties
 Zhang Ji (Republic of China) 張繼 (1882–1947), Kuomintang politician
 Zhang Ji (handballer) (张骥) (born 1978), Chinese handball player
 Zhang Ji (politician), a discipline inspector for the Communist Party of China